Debarment is the state of being excluded from enjoying certain possessions, rights, privileges, or practices and the act of prevention by legal means. For example, companies can be debarred from contracts due to allegations of fraud, mismanagement, and similar improprieties. Firms, individuals, and non-governmental organizations can be debarred.

In cross-debarment, organizations and agencies agree to mutually exclude others based on debarment by affiliates.

As an amendment to the U.S. Food and Drugs Act
Debarment is a penalty set forth in a 1992 amendment to the Food and Drugs Act, which the U.S. Food and Drug Administration can, and sometimes must, impose on persons or companies that engage in criminal conduct with respect to the development or approval of new drugs. The penalty itself is a prohibition against that person or company from submitting or assisting in the submission of such an application. By statute, it only applies to applications for approval of new drugs, and not to applications for other approvals granted by the FDA, such as changing a prescription drug to over-the-counter status, or approving a new food additive.

As of April 2009, the FDA has debarred 73 persons, an average of less than five per year, of which all but 9 were permanently debarred. The FDA debarred a corporate entity for the first time on March 1, 2018.

Constitutional issues 
In the earliest debarment cases, following the passage of the laws permitting the imposition of this penalty, the penalty was imposed on persons who had committed the offending acts had done so before the passage of those laws. They therefore argued that the application of this penalty to them was an unconstitutional ex post facto application of the law. Another constitutional issue raised was double jeopardy, it being argued that persons who had been tried, convicted, and sentenced to a particular punishment by a court of law could not be further penalized for the same offense. The courts rejected these arguments based on the finding that debarment was not intended as a punishment but rather as a means of protecting the public from persons who had exhibited the capacity for engaging in such conduct.

See also 
 Blacklisting

References

External links

Law of the United States
Blacklisting